James "Jamie" Day (born 13 September 1979 in Bexley, London, England) is an English football manager and former player. He is currently assistant head coach of Crawley Town and was formerly the head coach of Bangladesh national football team.

Playing career
Day began his playing career as a trainee at Arsenal where he earned a professional deal in 1998, although he failed to make a first team appearance, despite being named as a substitute in one first team fixture by Arsène Wenger .

He joined AFC Bournemouth for a fee of £20,000 in March 1999. He made his Bournemouth debut in April 1999 against Northampton Town. His first goal for the club came the following 1999-2000 season in a 2–0 away win against Cambridge United.

In the summer of 2001, he moved to Conference National side Dover Athletic. His first goal for the club came in a 2–1 loss against Hayes on 5 January 2002. At the end of the 2001-2002 season, Day couldn't prevent Dover's relegation from the division.

In November 2002, he was a part of the Dover side that reached the first round proper of the FA Cup, losing a first round tie against Football League club Oxford United.

He left the club in the summer of 2004 and joined Welling United. He remained at Welling until May 2007, when he returned to the Conference National, signing for Grays Athletic. He made his Grays Athletic debut on 18 August 2007 as a substitute in a 5–1 home win over Kidderminster Harriers. His first goal proved to be the winner on 3 November 2007 in a 1–0 away win over Salisbury City. He was sent out on loan to Conference South sides Eastbourne Borough and Havant & Waterlooville to gain further game time.

He left Grays in the summer of 2008, and secured a move to Dartford in August 2008.

Managerial career

England
In November 2009, he returned to Welling United having been appointed as player-manager of the Conference South club at the age of 30. His start as manager at Park View Road was delayed however with Dartford claiming he was still registered to them as a player.

Despite being docked five points at the start of the 2010-11 season for financial misconduct, Day led Welling to sixth place in the Conference South, missing out on the play-off places by one point. In April 2011, he ruled out any rumours that he was set to return to his former club, Dartford, as their manager.

A third-place finish at the end of the 2011-12 season saw Day lead Welling to the Conference South play-off places. His side defeated Sutton United in the play-off semi-finals, subsequently earning a play-off final tie with Dartford, however Welling missed out on promotion, suffering a 1–0 defeat.

The following 2012-13 campaign however saw Day guide Welling to promotion to the Conference National as Conference South champions. After reaching the 60 point mark, he led Welling to a 16th-place finish in their first season back in the Conference National.

Following a five-year spell in charge at Welling, he left to return to the Conference South, being appointed manager of Ebbsfleet United in December 2014. In April 2015, however, he was relieved of his duties alongside his assistants Barry Ashby and Dean Frost.

On 11 May 2015, he was announced as the new assistant manager at Forest Green Rovers in a role that saw him link up with his former manager at Welling United, Adrian Pennock.

On 21 May 2016, Day was named manager of Braintree Town. He was sacked in  September of the same year after only four months in charge. The following month he returned to Welling United, as first-team coach. In November 2016 he stepped up to replace Mark Goldberg as the manager. As first-team coach in second spell at Welling United he lost the first three matches against Ebbsfleet United, Hungerford Town and Hampton & Richmond. When Goldberg stepped aside he won all six of his matches in charge, in what marked his second spell as Welling manager. Day was undefeated in December 2016 and named as National League South Manager of the Month on 6 January 2017 - two days after leaving the club.

On 4 January 2017, Day left Welling to once again link-up with Adrian Pennock, this time at Gillingham.

Day left Gillingham in September 2017. In October 2017 he featured for Cray Valley Paper Mills as a player, scoring in a 2–1 win against Rochester United. On 12 February 2018 he reunited with Pennock once more, joining Barrow as assistant manager.

Bangladesh

On 17 May 2018, Bangladesh Football Federation announced that they have appointed Day as the head coach of Bangladesh national football team as well as the U-23. Under his guidance, Bangladesh put up its best performance ever in the 2018 Asian Games, where the team shocked by a 1–0 win over powerhouse Qatar and a draw to Thailand to reach the round of sixteen for the first time ever, which began to revive the past poupularity of football in Bangladesh. The team performed well in the 2018 SAFF Championship, Jamie Day was to keep his duty, where he coached Bangladesh U-23 team to have an acceptable third-place finish in the 2020 AFC U-23 Championship qualification, even though the team could not qualify, Bangladesh played good and only fell by minimal goal to Palestine and Bahrain.

Under Day's guidance, Bangladesh reached the third Round of 2023 AFC qualifiers, as the one of the three best fifth-position teams. Day integrated a "long-ball" style of play into the team, and although it was effective against lower ranked sides, the team struggled to maintain possession against better opposition. However, Day's tactics helped Bangladesh earn hard fought draws against India and Afghanistan during the 2023 AFC Asian Cup and  2022 World Cup joint qualifiers Day was placed on leave soon after the qualifiers.
In 2020 Jamie Day led the Bangladesh national team in qualifying to the next round of the Asian cup.

In September 2021, Bangladesh took part in the 2021 Three Nations Cup (Kyrgyzstan), the team lost all 3 games, conceding a total of 9 goals and only managing to score 3. These results led to Day being "put on leave" just before the 2021 SAFF Championship, held in Maldives To date, Day is the longest serving Bangladesh national team head coach.

Return to England
On 23 June 2022, Day was appointed assistant coach of League Two club Swindon Town. In January 2023, Day followed manager Scott Lindsey to join Crawley Town.

Managerial statistics

Honours

Welling United
Conference South league winners: 2012-13

BangladeshSouth Asian Games Bronze medalist: 2019
 Mujib Borsho FIFA International Football Series Winner: 2020
 2021 Three Nations Cup'''
 Runner-up: 2021

References

External links

1979 births
Living people
Footballers from Bexley
English footballers
Association football midfielders
Arsenal F.C. players
AFC Bournemouth players
Crawley Town F.C. players
Welling United F.C. players
Grays Athletic F.C. players
Dover Athletic F.C. players
Eastbourne Borough F.C. players
Havant & Waterlooville F.C. players
Dartford F.C. players
Ebbsfleet United F.C. players
Cray Valley Paper Mills F.C. players
English Football League players
National League (English football) players
English football managers
Welling United F.C. managers
Ebbsfleet United F.C. managers
Braintree Town F.C. managers
National League (English football) managers
Gillingham F.C. non-playing staff
English expatriate sportspeople in Bangladesh
Bangladesh national football team managers
Association football coaches
Barrow A.F.C. non-playing staff
Swindon Town F.C. non-playing staff
Crawley Town F.C. non-playing staff